Dendrorycter is a genus of moths in the family Gracillariidae.

Species
Dendrorycter marmaroides Kumata, 1978

External links
Global Taxonomic Database of Gracillariidae (Lepidoptera) 

Gracillariinae
Gracillarioidea genera